Edgar Driver (1 November  188515 September 1964) was a British actor.

Selected filmography 
 Song of the Plough (1933)
 Doss House (1933)
 Say It with Flowers (1934)
 Flood Tide (1934)
 The Admiral's Secret (1934)
 Kentucky Minstrels (1934)
 Designing Women (1934)
 Music Hall (1934)
 Jimmy Boy (1935)
 A Real Bloke (1935)
 The Small Man (1936)
 Men of Yesterday (1936)
 The Song of the Road (1937)
 Talking Feet (1937)
 Keep Fit (1937)
 Sunset in Vienna (1937)
 Stepping Toes (1938)
 Lily of Laguna (1938)
 Old Mother Riley's Circus (1941)
 Headline (1944)
 The Agitator (1945)
 The Grand Escapade (1946)
 Dark Secret (1949)
 Private's Progress (1956)
 Playback (1962)

References

External links 

1885 births
1964 deaths
Male actors from London
British male film actors
20th-century British male actors